Abtsgmünd is a municipality in the German state of Baden-Württemberg, in Ostalbkreis district. Abtsgmünd is located at the confluence of two streams, the Lein and the Kocher.

Famous locals include Patrick Benedict Zimmer who was born in the town.

Until 2006, Abtsgmünd was host to the Summer Breeze Open Air metal festival.

Gallery

Born in Abtsgmünd 

 Karl Allmendinger (1891-1965), General of the Wehrmacht
 Albert Schnez (1911-2007), General of the Bundeswehr

References

Ostalbkreis
Württemberg